The 1992 Japan Series was the Nippon Professional Baseball (NPB) championship series for the 1992 season. It was the 43rd Japan Series and featured the Pacific League champion Seibu Lions against the Central League champion Yakult Swallows. Seibu won their third consecutive PL pennant in convincing fashion to reach the series, and Yakult finished the season atop the competitive CL for the first time since 1978. Played at Meiji Jingu Stadium and Seibu Lions Stadium, the Lions defeated the Swallows four games to three in the best-of-seven series to win the franchise's 11th Japan Series title. Seibu's Sawamura Award winner Takehiro Ishii was named Most Valuable Player of the series. The series was played between October 17 and October 26 with home field advantage going to the Central League.

Summary

Matchups

Game 1

Game 2

Game 3

Game 4

Game 5

Game 6

Game 7

See also
1992 World Series

References

External links
 Nippon Professional Baseball—Official website (in English)

Japan Series
1992 Nippon Professional Baseball season
Seibu Lions
Tokyo Yakult Swallows